The Shuowen Jiezi Xichuan is an edition of and commentary on the second century Shuowen Jiezi  說文解字, published by the two brothers Xú Xuàn (徐鉉, 916–991) and Xú Kǎi (徐鍇, 920–974) during the Song dynasty.  It had a major influence on stabilizing the textual tradition of the work.

References 

Chinese dictionaries
Chinese characters
History of linguistics